This article lists events from the year 2008 in France.

Incumbents
 President: Nicolas Sarkozy
 Prime Minister: François Fillon

Events
1 January – Smoking banned in all public places (including bars and restaurants) in France.
2 February – Wedding of Nicolas Sarkozy and Carla Bruni.
9 and 16 March – Cantonal elections held.
12 March – Lazare Ponticelli, the country's last surviving First World War veteran, dies at the age of 110 – eight months before the 90th anniversary of the Armistice.
April – The Citroën C5 sedan is launched, whilst the station wagon was launched in May.
1 July – France assumes the Presidency of the Council of the European Union.
2 July – Íngrid Betancourt and 14 other hostages are rescued from FARC by Colombian security forces.
13 July – First meeting of Mediterranean Union, in Paris
10 September – Activation of Large Hadron Collider, localized between France and Switzerland
4 October – 50th Anniversary of the French Constitution of 1958 (French Fifth Republic).
27 November – XL Airways Germany Flight 888T crashed on a Mediterranean Sea, near Canet-en-Roussillon around Perpignan, killed seven people.
 October : Françoise Barré-Sinoussi and Luc Montagnier – the 2008 Nobel Prize in Physiology or Medicine
 Undated
Black music, des chaînes de fer aux chaînes d'or documentary film is released.
Yeallow, French indie rock band from Strasbourg is formed.

Deaths

January
3 January – Henri Chopin, avant-garde poet and musician (born 1922).
5 January – Raymond Forni, Socialist politician (born 1941).
5 January – Louis Hon, soccer player (born 1924).
7 January – Maryvonne Dupureur, Olympic athlete (born 1937).
7 January – Marcel Mouly, artist (born 1918).
7 January – Jean-Claude Vrinat, restaurateur (born 1936).
12 January – Louis Alexandre Raimon, hair stylist (born 1922).
16 January – Raymond Cambefort, one of the last three fully verified World War I veterans living in France (born 1900).
16 January – Pierre Lambert, Trotskyist leader (born 1920).
17 January – Carlos, singer, entertainer and actor (born 1943).
17 January – Madeleine Milhaud, actress (born 1902).
20 January – Louis de Cazenave, at the time of his death, the oldest French poilu still alive (born 1897).
29 January – Philippe Khorsand, actor (born 1948).

February
2 February – Roger Testu, cartoonist (born 1913).
6 February – Gwenc'hlan Le Scouëzec, writer and Grand Druid of Brittany (born 1929).
12 February – Jean Prouff, soccer player and manager (born 1919).
13 February – Henri Salvador, singer (born 1917).
13 February – Roger Voisin, trumpeter (born 1918).
18 February  – Alain Robbe-Grillet, writer and filmmaker (born 1922).
19 February – Jean-Michel Bertrand, politician (born 1943).
28 February – Gérard Calvet, Roman Catholic abbot (born 1927).

March
12 March – Lazare Ponticelli, last surviving official French veteran of the First World War (born 1897).
17 March – Roland Arnall, businessman and diplomat in the United States (born 1939).
19 March – Chantal Sébire, teacher and euthanasia campaigner (born 1955).
25 March – Thierry Gilardi, football and rugby commentator (born 1958).
26 March – Christian Bergelin, politician (born 1945).
27 March – Jean-Marie Balestre, sports executive (born 1921).
30 March – Marie-Françoise Audollent, actress (born 1943).

April
9 April – Jacques Morel, actor (born 1922).
11 April – Claude Abbes, international soccer player (born 1927).
17 April – Aimé Césaire, poet, author and politician (born 1913).
19 April – Germaine Tillion, anthropologist (born 1907).
20 April – Farid Chopel, actor, comedian and singer (born 1952).
23 April – Jean-Daniel Cadinot, film director and producer (born 1944).

May
9 May – Pascal Sevran, TV presenter and author (born 1945).
10 May – Paul Haeberlin, chef and restaurateur (born 1923).

June
1 June – Yves Saint Laurent, fashion designer (born 1936).
6 June – Paul Tessier, surgeon (born 1917).
11 June – Jean Desailly, actor (born 1920).
18 June – Jean Delannoy, actor, screenwriter and film director (born 1908).
26 June – Lilyan Chauvin, actress and writer (born 1925).
27 June – Frédéric Botton, lyricist and composer (b. c1937).
27 June – Raymond Lefèvre, orchestra leader, arranger and composer (born 1929).

July
10 July – Bernard Cahier, Formula One photo-journalist (born 1927).
28 July – Pierre Berès, bookseller and antiquarian book collector (born 1913).

August

September
 17 September – Patrick Alexandroni, actor, rapper, and television producer (born 1962)

October
13 October – Guillaume Depardieu Actor
20 October – Soeur Emmanuelle

November
1 November – Jacques Lunis, athlete (born 1923).

December

References

Links

2000s in France